The QIMR Berghofer Medical Research Institute (QIMR Berghofer) is an Australian medical research institute located in , Brisbane, in the state of Queensland. QIMR was established in 1945 by the Government of Queensland through the enactment of the Queensland Institute of Medical Research Act 1945 (Qld). Previously known as the Queensland Institute of Medical Research (QIMR), the original purpose of the institute was to further the study of tropical diseases in North Queensland. The current director is Professor Fabienne Mackay. The institute is a registered charity. In 2021, the institute was named as one of the  Queensland Greats by the Queensland Government.

Overview

QIMR Berghofer aims to improve the health and well-being of all people by developing new methods of detection, better treatments and prevention strategies. This is achieved through fundamental research, drug development and clinical trials.

QIMR Berghofer has over 600 scientists and staff and more than 150 research students across four research programs, four departments and a support division.

History
QIMR Berghofer was created by an act of the Queensland state parliament in 1945 from a report by Edward Derrick that recommended a permanent research facility to be set up to investigate diseases unique to the climate of Queensland. QIMR Berghofer began operations in 1947 with a staff of seven in a disused World War II US Army hut in Victoria Park, Brisbane. This temporary accommodation housed the institute for the next 30 years.

From 1951 to 1965, at a field station in North Queensland, QIMR Berghofer researchers investigated outbreaks of leptospirosis, scrub typhus, dengue and other tropical fevers. Researchers also studied viruses in Queensland's animals.

In 1960, QIMR Berghofer scientists isolated Murray Valley encephalitis virus from mosquitoes, which paved the way for discovery of other arboviruses like Ross River virus in 1963. During the 1960s, QIMR Berghofer established an oncology section to investigate cancer-causing viruses. One project researched cancer cells taken from Burkitt's lymphoma patients in Papua New Guinea, and found they were infected with Epstein-Barr virus (EBV). EBV is now known to cause many types of leukaemias and lymphomas. Eight years later, this same virus was found to immortalise white blood cells; a discovery that revolutionised research of these immune cells and their DNA.

In 1977, QIMR Berghofer relocated to new laboratories in the grounds of the Royal Brisbane and Women's Hospital at Herston.

In 1988, the Queensland Government amended the QIMR Act to make the institute a statutory authority. The Queensland Premier at the time, Mike Ahern, secured $30 million to fund a new building for QIMR Berghofer's increasing staff. The new building was officially opened in 1991, and was named the Bancroft Centre, as a memorial to the family who contributed to QIMR Berghofer's early history.

In 1997, a philanthropic donation of $20 million was matched by both the federal and state governments, which has used to build the Cancer Research Centre, named after contributor Clive Berghofer.

In 2002, Q-Pharm Pty Limited became operational at the QIMR Berghofer Cancer Research Centre. Q-Pharm Pty Ltd is owned by QIMR Berghofer, and is a Phase I clinical trials facility to test potential new therapeutic products on humans. The same year, a new Indigenous Health Research Program was initiated to focus on improving health outcomes for Aboriginal and Torres Strait Islander peoples and work in collaboration with Indigenous communities.

In August 2013, QIMR was renamed QIMR Berghofer Medical Research Institute after Clive Berghofer AM donated $50.1 million to the institute.

Logo
The QIMR Berghofer logo is composed of three superimposed hexagons, which represent interlocking benzene rings. Benzene rings are a molecular structure of carbon, the basis for all life on earth.

QIMR Berghofer came together with Children's Health Queensland, Mater Health Services, Metro North Hospital and Health Service, Metro South Health, Queensland University of Technology, The University of Queensland and the Translational Research Institute to form Brisbane Diamantina Health Partners, Queensland's first academic health science system.

Research
The institute's research includes:
 Cancers, including leukaemia, skin, breast, prostate, pancreatic, oesophageal and colorectal cancers
 Infectious diseases such as HIV, malaria, group A streptococcus, Epstein-Barr virus, Ross River virus, scabies, dengue fever and schistosomiasis (blood flukes)
 Mental health, including schizophrenia, dementia and Alzheimer's disease
 Chronic disorders such as liver disease, asthma and haemochromatosis

Location
The institute is located at 300 Herston Rd, Herston, Brisbane, Australia.

QIMR Berghofer is housed in three buildings (the Bancroft Centre, the Clive Berghofer Cancer Research Centre and QIMR Berghofer Central at Herston, Brisbane, Queensland adjacent to the Royal Brisbane and Women's Hospital and The University of Queensland Medical School.

Key people

Directors

Other key people
Deputy Director: David Whiteman
Council Chair:  Arun Sharma
Patron: Paul de Jersey , Governor of Queensland

Awards 
In 2010, the Queensland Institute of Medical Research was inducted into the Queensland Business Leaders Hall of Fame.

In 2021, the institute was named as one of the  Queensland Greats by the Queensland Government.

See also

Health in Australia

References

External links

Research institutes established in 1945
1945 establishments in Australia
QIMR Berghofer Medical Research Institute
Herston, Queensland
Queensland Greats